Campo (Spanish for "Field") is an unincorporated community in the Mountain Empire area of southeastern San Diego County, California, United States. The population was 2,684 at the 2010 census. For statistical purposes, the United States Census Bureau has defined Campo as a census-designated place (CDP). The census definition of the area may not precisely correspond to local understanding of the area with the same name.

The CDP includes three distinct settlements: Campo, Cameron Corners and Morena Village. Morena Village is located several miles further north, just east of Lake Morena. These communities all use Campo postal addresses and the ZIP Code 91906.

History
Morena Dam was constructed between 1896 and 1912 to provide water to the San Diego area.

Campo was a station on the San Diego and Arizona Railway, completed in 1919.

Campo was a military town during World War II and was known as Camp Lockett. It was home to a veterans' convalescent hospital, a 300-bed Italian Prisoner-of-war camp in Cameron Corners and an all African-American Cavalry unit which patrolled the border on horseback until 1944.

The United States Military continues to maintain activities nearby at La Posta Mountain Warfare Training Facility.

Geography
Nearby communities include Boulevard, Potrero, Tecate, Dulzura, Jacumba, Pine Valley, Mount Laguna, Descanso, and Jamul.

According to the United States Census Bureau, the CDP covers an area of 23.5 square miles (60.7 km), 99.97% of it land, and 0.03% of it water.

Climate
Campo has a hot-summer Mediterranean climate (Csa) with hot, dry summers and cool, relatively wet winters. The diurnal temperature variation is large throughout the year.

Demographics

The 2010 United States Census reported that Campo had a population of 2,684. The racial makeup of Campo was 2,083 (77.6%) White, 794 (29.6%) Latino, 114 (4.2%) African American, 90 (3.4%) Native American, 31 (1.2%) Asian, 6 (0.2%) Pacific Islander, 248 (9.2%) from other races, and 112 (4.2%) from two or more races.

The Census reported that 2,499 people (93.1% of the population) lived in households, 50 (1.9%) lived in non-institutionalized group quarters, and 135 (5.0%) were institutionalized.

There were 901 households, out of which 334 (37.1%) had children under the age of 18 living in them, 491 (54.5%) were opposite-sex married couples living together, 80 (8.9%) had a female householder with no husband present, 58 (6.4%) had a male householder with no wife present. There were 67 (7.4%) unmarried opposite-sex partnerships, and 5 (0.6%) same-sex married couples or partnerships. 199 households (22.1%) were made up of individuals, and 80 (8.9%) had someone living alone who was 65 years of age or older. The average household size was 2.77. There were 629 families (69.8% of all households); the average family size was 3.27.

The population was spread out, with 811 people (30.2%) under the age of 18, 182 people (6.8%) aged 18 to 24, 676 people (25.2%) aged 25 to 44, 727 people (27.1%) aged 45 to 64, and 288 people (10.7%) who were 65 years of age or older. The median age was 35.2 years. For every 100 females, there were 119.6 males. For every 100 females age 18 and over, there were 109.0 males.

The homeowner vacancy rate was 4.9%; the rental vacancy rate was 13.4%. 1,806 people (67.3% of the population) lived in owner-occupied housing units and 693 people (25.8%) lived in rental housing units.

Features
Campo is home to three museums: The Pacific Southwest Railway Museum, the Motor Transport Museum and the Gaskill Brothers Stone Store.

A CDF fire station is located at 31577 State Route 94. The 1998 Cameron Corners, California 7.5-minute quadrangle plots the station near Dewey Place and SR 94. A Southern California Automobile Association map, believed to be c. 1910–1930, shows a business named "Dewey Store" in Cameron Corners. The business is plotted on the north side of SR 94 just east of County Road S1. This may be a variant name of Dewey Place.

There is a county road maintenance station on Forrest Gate Road and a county fire station at Jeb Stewart Road and Parker Road.

Large employers in the area include US Department of Homeland Security Border Patrol and the San Diego County, California Probation, Juvenile Ranch Facility, (population 250).

According to a September 9, 2004 San Diego Union Tribune article, foster care activist Father Joe Carroll proposed building a foster camp for children here. Although the project was approved by the Board of Supervisors in 2008, it has since been abandoned for lack of funds.

Transportation
The name of the field is not listed in the National Geographic Names Data Base or U.S. Department of Transportation, Federal Aviation Administration, Location Identifiers (7350.7U) dated 09/01/2005 (2005-09-01).

The town is along the line of the former Southern Pacific (originally San Diego and Arizona Railway). Freight operations are currently embargoed (not offered) by the Carrizo Gorge Railway (currently the Pacific Imperial Railroad), while passenger operations are operated by the Pacific Southwest Railway Museum. The Railroad Museum shows an address of 750 Depot Street and is located near (NAD83) .

Tribal areas
There are at least two tribal areas included in the nearby Campo Indian Reservation. One is about  due north of Campo and adjoining Cameron Corners. The reservation government is the Campo Band of Mission Indians. It extends  to the north and beyond Interstate 8. The tribal government has been reported in the news media to provide wireless Internet service to members over a cooperative tribal government microwave backbone from Pala.

Schools
31360 State Route 94: federal records report three schools in Campo. The schools are:
 Rancho Del Campo High School - Juvenile Ranch (Detention) Facility (9-12)
 Campo Elementary School (K-8)
 Campo Continuation (at the old Campo Elementary School)
 Hillside Alternative Junior/Senior High (7-12)
 Cottonwood Community Day (7-12)
 Mountain Empire Junior/Senior High (7-12)

This is considered in Campo for postal addresses.

See also

 Tecate, California
 Canyon City, California
 Manzanita, San Diego County, California
 Camp Lockett
 San Diego County, California Probation Department

References

Further reading

External links
 San Diego County Probation Department description of the Juvenile Ranch Facility (JRF)
 Sheriff's Department description of Campo juvenile facility.
 San Diego Railroad Museum, Campo
 The Motor Transport Museum

Census-designated places in California
Census-designated places in San Diego County, California
Mountain Empire (San Diego County)